Willy Valcke was a sailor from the Belgium, who represented his native country at the 1920 Summer Olympics in Ostend, Belgium. Valcke took the 4th place in the 6 Metre.

References

Sources

External links

Belgian male sailors (sport)
Sailors at the 1920 Summer Olympics – 6 Metre
Olympic sailors of Belgium
Year of birth missing
Year of death missing
Place of birth missing